The Punjab Police (Punjabi, Urdu: پنجاب پولیس) is a law-enforcement agency in the province of Punjab, Pakistan. Under the command of its Inspector General (IG), it administers all criminal cases under the Police Acts of 1861 and 2002. The force was introduced in its modern form under British rule, and a colonial influence continues. It is seen by some as an intimidating, rather than a friendly, organization. On 23 January 2023 Dr. Usman Anwar was appointed Inspector General of Police Punjab Pakistan.

History

Mughal Empire
Under the Mughal Empire, policing was organized on the basis of land tenure. Zamindars were responsible for apprehending disturbers of the public peace and performing other policing duties. At the village level, these functions were performed by the village headman. In large towns, functionaries known as kotwals combined law enforcement, municipal administration and revenue collection. Watchmen were on patrol and violent, organized crime was usually handled by the military.

British Raj
The modern system of policing was introduced during British rule. The British administration relieved the zamindars of responsibility for police service, and introduced magistrates with daroghas and other subordinate officers. The Punjab Police was organized in two branches: the Military Preventive Police and the Civil Detective Police. This arrangement proved unsatisfactory, however, and the government of British India urged the government of Punjab to investigate the province's system of policing in 1860. Due to the importance of the issue, the central government appointed a commission to investigate policing in British India. The Calcutta Police Commission of 1860 recommended abolition of the police's military arm, the appointment of an Inspector General of Police in the province and the supervision of police in a district by a District Superintendent. The commission recommended that only the district magistrate should conduct law-enforcement functions. Based on the commission's recommendations, the government of India submitted a bill which was enacted as Act V of 1861; the Police Act of 1861 was adopted. The organizational structure of the act still survives.

The Punjab Police Rules of 1933 documented the police practices of the time, and introduced measures for improving administration and operational effectiveness. The rules indicate that the Punjab Police was a professional police organization by 1934, had considerable knowledge of the province's crime and criminals, and developed effective procedures and practices for dealing with various kinds of criminal activity. The force's administrative and disciplinary functions were also described. They have been the model for similar rules in other provinces of Pakistan, and are still in force.

After independence

The Punjab Police played a significant role in handling the refugee crisis of 1947–48. It continued as a separate organization until 1955, when it was merged with the police of other provinces to create the West Pakistan Police. The West Pakistan Deputy Inspector General was Inayat Ali Shah. The East and West Pakistan DIGs reported to an IG who, during the 1950s, was Qurban Ali Khan. Several unsuccessful attempts were made to review and reform police organization and performance during the 1950s and 1960s. The Pakistan police's legal framework underwent a major change as a consequence of the Devolution of Power Plan, which was implemented between 2001 and 2006. The plan devolved much provincial-governmental authority and functions to the districts, and introduced public accountability of the police.

A system of district governments was introduced with the Punjab Local Government Ordinance 2001. As a part of the plan, the Police Order replaced the Police Act 1861 in 2002 and brought sweeping changes to the police. The new law introduced public accountability in the form of Public Safety Commissions at the district, provincial and national level. The Police Order 2002 also provided for an independent Police Complaints Authority, increased autonomy of the Inspector General of Police and separated investigation from other police functions.
The Punjab Police are engaged in counterterrorism operations in the province.

Organization 

The Punjab Police is constituted by the Police Order 2002 and operates under the Police Rules of 1934. The Central Police Office (CPO) in  Lahore which has a number of branches, including the Legal Affairs Division (Legal Branch), Finance and Welfare, Operations, Training, and Research and Development. The branches report to the Inspector General of Police through their Additional Inspectors General of Police. The Regional Police Officers report to the Inspector General of Police, and are not part of the Punjab CPO. The Inspector General of Police is the ex officio secretary of the government of Punjab. The Punjab Police is staffed by its officers and those of the Police Service of Pakistan.

Units:
Anti-Riot Force (ARF)
Punjab Safe Cities Authority (PSCA)
Counter Terrorism Department (CTD)
Criminal Investigation Agency (CIA)
Special Protection Unit (SPU)
Punjab Elite Force
Punjab Boundary Force
Punjab River Police
Punjab Traffic Police
Punjab Highway Patrol
Dolphin Force
Punjab Constabulary

Main formations:
Central Police Office, Punjab
Police Regions
Investigation Branch
Special Branch
Telecommunication Branch
Operations Branch

Equipment 
 Beretta 92FS
 Glock pistols
 Heckler & Koch MP5 - Pakistani MP5 (P2 & P3) and POF-5 variants (manufactured under license by Pakistan Ordnance Factories)
 Type 56 assault rifle - Primary firearm
 Heckler & Koch G3 - Pakistani G3 (P3 & P4) variants (manufactured under license by Pakistan Ordnance Factories)
 Rheinmetall MG 3 - Mounted on vehicles (manufactured under license by Pakistan Ordnance Factories)
 Shotguns
 Riot guns

Vehicles 
Mohafiz (internal security vehicle)
Toyota Hilux (single-cab and double-cabin)
Toyota Corolla
Suzuki Cultus
Suzuki Mehran
Nissan Patrol
Suzuki Every
Honda City
Foton Tunland
Suzuki Swift
Toyota Land Cruiser
Toyota Land Cruiser (70 Series)
Toyota Fortuner
Toyota Prius
Officers are allotted cars by rank. Bulletproof vehicles are provided to officers at sensitive posts.

Ranks

Controversies

The Anti-Corruption Establishment Punjab called Punjab Police the most corrupt public department in the province in a 2010 report. Members of the force have been involved in a number of criminal activities. In November 2017, a man was killed in a setup in Faisalabad. Initially identified as a robber, he was an unarmed civilian who had had an affair with a relative of the Gujranwala District deputy superintendent of police and left the country. During a visit to Pakistan, plainclothes police officer shot and killed him.
Sexual assault, harassment, and mistreatment of women have also occurred. Express News reported on 20 November 2017 that two Punjab Police officers tore a woman's clothes, made a  video, tried to blackmail her and shared the video on social media. Both officers were fired, but it is unknown if they faced criminal charges. Faisalabad police gang-raped the wife of a fellow police officer.

In November 2017, a video on social media depicted Punjab Police officers torturing an elderly couple; the entire police station was suspended. A seven-year-old child was arrested for kidnapping by Punjab Police in 2015. A 12-year-old was arrested by Punjab Police in Bahawalpur District after they failed to arrest his father, a farmer named in an FIR for disputing the price of sugar cane at a sugar mill. The boy brought his schoolbooks to jail.

Uniform change 
In 2017, the Punjab Police changed its standard uniform from black shirts and khaki pants to all olive-green. The change had a mixed reaction; the government said that it had consulted professional designers, but the new uniform has been criticized as dull and less attractive But as time go Olive Green uniform acquired its own distinct identity and position.

See also
 Punjab Police College Sihala
 Law enforcement in Pakistan
 Dolphin Force
 Punjab Highway Patrol
 Punjab Prisons (Pakistan)
 Balochistan Police
 Khyber Pakhtunkhwa Police
 Sindh Police

References

External links
 

 
Provincial law enforcement agencies of Pakistan
1861 establishments in British India